The 1962 La Flèche Wallonne was the 26th edition of La Flèche Wallonne cycle race and was held on 7 May 1962. The race started in Liège and finished in Charleroi. The race was won by Henri De Wolf of the Gitane team.

General classification

References

1962 in road cycling
1962
1962 in Belgian sport
1962 Super Prestige Pernod